Parsonsia howeana is a vigorous twining vine of the family Apocynaceae. It is endemic to Australia’s subtropical Lord Howe Island in the Tasman Sea. It is common in the island's forests at low elevations.

Description
The young stems of the vine are covered with fine hairs. The glossy, elliptical leaves are 4–9 cm long and 1.5–3 cm wide. The plant flowers throughout the year; the terminal or axillary inflorescences comprise clusters of orange to reddish-brown, sometimes yellowish, small honey-scented flowers. The ribbed, flattened, ellipsoidal seeds are 1.5 cm long.

References

howeana
Gentianales of Australia
Endemic flora of Lord Howe Island
Plants described in 1994
Vines
Taxa named by John Beaumont Williams